"Out of Space" is the fourth EP/single released by English electronic music group the Prodigy in 1992. The song is also featured on their debut album, Experience (1992), and is the fourth single from it. The song samples the 1976 song "Chase the Devil" by Max Romeo as well as some lines by rapper Kool Keith on the 1988 track "Critical Beatdown" by Ultramagnetic MCs.

The song is arguably the most successful of the Prodigy's early period and was often played live by the band. The British Phonographic Industry certified the single gold in May 2021.

In 2005 "Out of Space" was released as a remix by Audio Bullys in the single "Voodoo People / Out of Space" from the greatest hits compilation Their Law: The Singles 1990–2005.

Critical reception
In his weekly UK chart commentary, James Masterton said, "This track is by far their most commercial yet. It may not progress much further but is their 4th Top 20 entry this year, not a feat to be sniffed at." Charles Aaron from Spin wrote, "Swirling and constantly transforming, this here's techno that bends your mind and tickles your belly."

Music video
The colour-negative music video for the song, directed by Russell Curtis, featured the band raving in a rural setting. Keith Flint was dressed up in a "raver's outfit", wearing white overalls, a face mask and fluorescent gloves, sniffing Vicks VapoRub. It also featured footage of the band's live shows at the time and ostriches. The video received heavy rotation on MTV Europe.

Track listing

XL
7" vinyl record
A. "Out of Space"
B. "Ruff in the Jungle Bizness" (Uplifting Vibes Remix) (4:17)

12" vinyl record
"Out of Space" (Original Mix) (5:07)
"Out of Space" (Techno Underworld Remix) (4:48)
"Ruff in the Jungle Bizness" (Uplifting Vibes Remix) (4:20)
"Music Reach" (1/2/3/4) (Live) (4:21)

Cassette Single
"Out of Space" (3.41)
"Ruff in the Jungle Bizness" (Uplifting Vibes Remix) (4.20)

CD single
"Out of Space" (Edit) (3:41)
"Out of Space" (Techno Underworld Remix) (4:48)
"Ruff in the Jungle Bizness" (Uplifting Vibes Remix) (4:20)
"Music Reach" (1/2/3/4) (Live) (4:21)

Elektra
CD single
"Out of Space" (Edit) (3:41)
"Out of Space" (Techno Underworld Remix) (4:48)
"Out of Space" (Millenium Mix) (6:25)
"Out of Space" (Celestial Bodies Mix) (5:44)
"Ruff in the Jungle Bizness" (Uplifting Vibes Mix) (4:20)
"Jericho" (Live Version) (4:22)

Tracks 2 and 5 remixed by Liam Howlett.
Tracks 3 and 4 remixed by Mark Picchiotti and Teri Bristol.

Charts

Weekly charts

Year-end charts

Certifications

|}

References

External links

1992 singles
1992 songs
The Prodigy songs
Songs written by Liam Howlett
XL Recordings singles
Songs about outer space